Bueng Kan is a town (thesaban mueang) in Mueang Bueng Kan district, in Bueng Kan province, far northeastern Thailand. It is the district capital and is on the Mekong River, opposite the Laotian town of Pakxan of Bolikhamsai province. The economy is based on agriculture, with para rubber as the principal crop, and tourism.

History
The settlement became a sanitary district in 1956. Like all sanitary districts, it was upgraded to sub-district municipality in 1999.

Bueng Kan was formerly part of Nong Khai Province until the formal establishment of the new province of the same name on 23 March 2011.

Bueng means marsh; Kan is associated with the Hindu deity Kāla, or the colour black.

Transport
The city is connected to many major cities by day and night airconditioned express buses. The journey to Udon Thani  takes around 3 hours 45 minutes, and Bangkok is from 10 hours 30 minutes to  12 hours away depending on company and route.

Udon Thani International Airport with direct flights (under normal conditions) to Chiang Mai, Pattaya U-Tapao, Phuket, and both Bangkok airports, is at 200km by road from the city.  Sakon Nakhon regional airport at 172km with flights to Bangkok (Don Mueang) at 172km. 

The nearest rail connection is Udon Thani railway station in the centre of Udon city.

Building of the fifth Thai–Lao Friendship Bridge began in 2021. Construction of the bridge at about 4km west of the city centre is expected to take 3 years for a completion in 2023.  The project will link the cities of Bueng Kan in Thailand and Bolikhamxai in Laos across the Mekong River. Its cost will be around US$130.3 million. Thailand has agreed to pay US$25.47 million and Laos is covering about US$46.13 million. The bridge will enable Vietnam to be reached by road from Thailand through Laos over a distance of 150km. Already existing Thai-Lao Friendship Bridges link Nong Khai province with Vientiane Prefecture (First Thai–Lao Friendship Bridge; Mukdahan with Savannakhet (Second Thai–Lao Friendship Bridge); Nakhon Phanom with Thakhek (Third Thai–Lao Friendship Bridge); and  Chiang Rai province with Houayxay (Fourth Thai–Lao Friendship Bridge).

References

External links
The navel of the Mekong. 29 October 2020. Bangkok Post

Populated places in Bueng Kan province
Populated places on the Mekong River
Cities and towns in Thailand